Checkerboard is an unincorporated community in Meagher County, Montana, United States.

Checkerboard takes its name from nearby Checkerboard Creek, though the origin of the creek's name is uncertain. As of 1995, it had a year-round population of 22 and a summer population of 30 to 50 residents. It is home to an annual Labor Day parade, which the Billings Gazette speculated may be the smallest parade in Montana.

References

Unincorporated communities in Meagher County, Montana
Unincorporated communities in Montana